JK Lakshmipat University (JKLU) was established in Jaipur, the capital city of Rajasthan, in the year 2011. The curriculum and pedagogy of the university emphasises experiential learning through projects. The University is sponsored by the J. K. Organisation.

Academics 
The university provides various undergraduate, postgraduate and doctoral degrees. It has institutes, IET (Institute of Engineering & Technology)  and IM (Institute of Management), and ID (Institute of Design).

Undergraduate 

B.Tech (4 years)
B.Des (4 years)
BBA (3 years)
BCA

Postgraduate 
Pinnacle MBA (2 years)
M.Tech (2 years)
M.Des.

Doctoral 

Ph.D in Management (Management Studies)
Ph.D in Engineering

References

External links
 

Universities and colleges in Jaipur
Universities in Rajasthan
Educational institutions established in 2011
2011 establishments in Rajasthan